Plaňany is a market town in Kolín District in the Central Bohemian Region of the Czech Republic. It has about 1,900 inhabitants.

Administrative parts
Villages of Blinka, Hradenín and Poboří are administrative parts of Plaňany.

Geography
It lies in a flat agricultural landscape of the Central Elbe Table. The market town is situated on the right bank of the Výrovka River.

History
The first written mention of Plaňany is from 1222, under its old name Plaňasy. In 1421 and 1424, the village was burned down by the Hussites, then it was looted by the army of King George of Poděbrady in 1448. Probably in 1572, during the rule of the Mírek of Solopysky family, the village was promoted to a market town.

Sights
The landmark of Plaňany is the Church of the Annunciation of the Virgin Mary. It is a Romanesque cemetery church from the mid-12th century with a Gothic extension from the 14th century. Next to the church is a free-standing half-timbered belfry. Near this church are also the neo-Gothic Church of the Nativity of St. John the Baptist from 1901 and a Baroque rectory, which are not cultural monuments.

A notable building is the Baroque granary. It was originally a Renaissance fortress built in 1530–1539, but it was rebuilt into a granary in the 1740s.
It served as a granary until the mid-20th century.

Notable people
Wilhelm Würfel (1790–1832), composer
Bedřich Bernau (1849–1904), archaeologist and ethnographist; lived and died here
Josef Nádvorník (1906–1977), lichenologist

References

External links

Market towns in the Czech Republic